The Malacological Society of London is a British learned society and charitable organisation concerned with malacology, the study of molluscs, a large phylum of invertebrate animals divided into nine or ten taxonomic classes, of which two are extinct.

Founded in 1893, the society was one of the earliest such national bodies anywhere in the world concerned only with molluscs, although the Conchological Society of Great Britain and Ireland is older.

History
The society was founded in 1893 "to advance education, research and learning for the public benefit in the study of Mollusca from both pure and applied aspects". The society's first president was Henry Woodward.

On 15 September 1901 the society lost its secretary, Martin Fountain Woodward, who was drowned when a boat he was travelling in capsized off the coast of County Galway while he was in temporary charge of the marine biological laboratory of the Fisheries Board for Ireland at Innisbofin.

Founding members included the zoologist and malacologist E. A. Smith, president of the society from 1901 to 1903, and J. R. le B. Tomlin, who named more than a hundred taxa of gastropod molluscs. Another notable early member was the geologist Caroline Birley, who joined the society in 1894. Henry Haversham Godwin-Austen (1834–1923), author of The Land and Freshwater Mollusca of India (1882–1887) and George Bond Howes (1853–1905) were early presidents of the society, and M. W. K. Connolly, who published some fifty papers on molluscs, was a member of the society from 1908 to 1938 and was president of the Conchological Society in 1930. The Australian naturalist Charles Hedley was a vice-president of the society from 1923 until his death in 1926. Ronald Winckworth, a member since 1919, served as the society's editor and went on to be its president from 1939 to 1942.

Work

Molluscs range in size from cephalopods such as the octopus and giant squid to microscopic gastropod snails, and the society is concerned with some 85,000 recognised extant species, which include 23 per cent of all named marine organisms as well as molluscs living in freshwater and terrestrial habitats. It is also interested in the species (including those of the two extinct classes of molluscs) preserved as fossils, which creates a relationship with the study of geology.

In association with the Oxford University Press, the society publishes the Journal of Molluscan Studies, previously called Proceedings of the Malacological Society, and Proceedings of the Malacological Society of London, an international journal to disseminate new research work on molluscs, and also a bulletin, The Malacologist, for its own members, to which there is free access on the society's web site.

The society organises meetings and symposia and seeks to advance education about and awareness of molluscs. It gives prizes for contributions in its field and makes awards to students (and also to others who are not employed) to enable them to travel and research malacological subjects.

An annual Malacological Society "Molluscan Forum" takes place at the Natural History Museum, London, with the 14th held in November 2011. An informal event, this is intended to bring together people beginning mollusc research, whether palaeontological, physiological, ecological, morphological, systematic, or molecular, with time for presentations and discussions. Attendance is open to all, at no charge, but those wishing to give presentations should be students engaged on molluscan projects or amateurs with substantial unpublished work.
 
The society has been registered with the Charity Commission for England and Wales since 1978, with the registration number 275980.

Structure

Membership of the society is open to all by subscription, with three classes of members, student members, ordinary members and honorary members, of whom there can be no more than five at any one time.

The society's affairs are managed by a council consisting of officers and members elected at annual general meetings. Six elected members of the council, who are called councillors, serve for three years each, with two vacancies arising every year. The officers are a president, two vice-presidents, an honorary secretary and an honorary treasurer, a membership secretary, the editor of the journal and the editor of The Malacologist, an awards officer, and a web manager. Up to four additional members of the council can be co-opted.

Similar societies
In the UK: 
 Conchological Society of Great Britain and Ireland
In other countries:
 American Malacological Society
 Malacological Society of Australasia 
 Belgian Malacological Society 
 Estonian Malacological Society 
 German Malacological Society 
 Hawaiian Malacological Society
 Israel Malacological Society
 Italian Malacological Society 
 Malacological Society of Japan
 Netherlands Malacological Society 
 Association of Polish Malacologists
 European Quaternary Malacologists 
 Conchologists of America

See also 
 Linnean Society of London
 Geological Society of London
 Geologists' Association
 List of geoscience organisations

References

External links 

Malacological Society of London: official web site
Journal of Molluscan Studies at oxfordjournals.org
The Malacologist (Bulletin of the society, online edition)
The American Malacological Society: official web site
The Australasian Malacological Society: official web site
The Netherlands Malacological Society: official web site 
Hardy's Internet Guide to Marine Gastropods
Mollia Information for Malacologists at ucmp.berkeley.edu
Researchers complete mollusc evolutionary tree at physorg.com, dated 26 October 2011
Planktonic mollusca fact sheets at tafi.org.au
Shell Image Gallery of Rotterdam Natural History Museum

British biology societies
Regional and local learned societies of the United Kingdom
Malacological societies
Scientific organizations established in 1893
1893 establishments in the United Kingdom
Zoology organizations